Viasat Ticket or  Viasat Ticket 1 (2002) is a Scandinavian pay-per-view/pay-per-day service. Viasat Ticket 2-10 was closed down in 2006 and Viasat Ticket 1 or Just Viasat Ticket was still available to 2009 (1998-2009). Viasat Ticket PPV/PPD brand was available from 1998–2009 in Viasat Scandinavia. Viasat Ticket was replaced with VOD service Viasat On Demand 2009 later renamed Viaplay (2010) and Viasat TV1000 later renamed to Viasat Film (2012)/ Viasat's Erotic channels. Viasat Ticket 1/Viasat Ticket is still existing on Sirius 4/Astra 4A (5.0E) satellite, but there is only a black screen.

Channels
Viasat Ticket 2-10 2002-2006
Viasat Ticket/Viasat Ticket 1 1998-2009 
Private Spice (Erotic movies) 2008-2012

Pan-Nordic television channels
Television channels in Sweden
Television channels and stations established in 2001